"I Don't Want to Live Without You" is a song written by Mick Jones that was first released by the pop rock band Foreigner on their 1987 album Inside Information. Jones has rated it as one of his favorite Foreigner songs.

Released as the follow-up single to the song "Say You Will," "I Don't Want to Live Without You" peaked at #5 on the Billboard Hot 100 chart in May 1988. It was the band's ninth and final Top 10 hit, and its sixteenth and final entry in the Top 40 portion of the Billboard pop singles chart. On the Billboard adult contemporary chart, the song became Foreigner's only #1 hit, spending one week atop the tally the week of May 14, 1988. The band had previously reached the Top 5 on the AC chart twice, with the songs "Waiting for a Girl Like You" (#5 in 1981) and "I Want to Know What Love Is" (#3 in 1985).

Cash Box said that "Mick Jones has fashioned a lush and emotional track for Lou Gramm's well-measured singing" and that "if you loved 'I Want to Know What Love Is' from Agent Provocateur you'll flip for this one."

Charts

Weekly charts

Year-end charts

See also
 List of Hot Adult Contemporary number ones of 1988

References

1988 singles
Foreigner (band) songs
Songs written by Mick Jones (Foreigner)
1987 songs
1980s ballads
Rock ballads
Atlantic Records singles
Song recordings produced by Mick Jones (Foreigner)